Großpösna is a municipality in the Leipzig district, in Saxony, Germany. It consists of Großpösna proper and the Ortschaften (localities) Dreiskau-Muckern, Güldengossa, Seifertshain and Störmthal.

Points of interest 
 Botanischer Garten für Arznei- und Gewürzpflanzen Oberholz, a botanical garden
 Highfield Festival, a music festival that takes place at the Störmthaler See near Großpösna, usually every August.

References 

Leipzig (district)